Pannaipuram is a panchayat town in Theni district in the Indian state of Tamil Nadu. It is located hill foot of "Western Ghats" sharing its border with Kerala State and has very good literacy. Pannaipuram Town panchayat includes 4 villages namely Pannaipuram, Kariyanampatty, Mallingapuram and P. Renganathapuram. Mahalingeswarar Temple, Kaliamman Temple and Bommaiyaswamy Temple are located in Pannaipuram. Veereswarar Temple is located in Kariyanampatty. Most of the people in Pannaipuram are engaged in Cardamom cultivation and trade in nearby Kerala hills.

Taluk: Uthamapalayam, 
District: Theni, 
Assembly Constituency: Cumbum (From 2011), earlier it was Bodinayakkanur.
Parliament Constituency: Theni

Demographics
 India census, Pannaipuram had a population of 9323. Males constitute 49.6% of the population and females 50.4%. Pannaipuram has an average literacy rate of 74.93%, higher than the national average of 59.5%: male literacy is 82.58%, and female literacy is 67.42%. In Pannaipuram, 8.34% of the population is under 6 years of age.

Name
In Tamil Pannai means farm and puram means place or ground. People who lived in the village were agri and cattle farmers. The cattle grazing grounds were at the western ghats foothills adjacent to the village, hence the origin of name Pannaipuram.

Agriculture
Agriculture, cattle farms and brick manufacture are the major revenue source at Pannaipuram. Most of the tropical vegetables are grown. Many of the residents of the village have Cardamom, Coffee, Tea, Black Pepper, Clove, Coco and beetle-nut plantations in the adjacent hills of western ghats. After the state divide on language basis the hills are now part of Kerala.

Water Resources
Underground water was fully depleted, as the cultivation relies only on the same. 
The 18th canal project completed in 2008 and the rain water harvesting has helped in raising the ground water level. This has helped farming and agriculture in and around the village. Drinking water is drawn from the Mullai Periyar river running through the nearby town Uthamapalayam.

Flora and Fona
Neem, hibiscus, fig, wild berries, coconut, mango, lemon, banana, moringa and mostly tropical vegetation found in this region.

Birds
Common sighting of peacocks and peahens, roosters, hens, crows, sparrows and parrots are found in this region

Personalities
Panaipuram is birthplace of the prominent film personalities;
Indian music director Ilaiyaraja and his family; 
Gangai Amaran who is also a music director film director is his brother. 
Yuvan Shankar Raja and Karthik Raja are his sons, Bhavatharini is his daughter.

Neutrino Project
Pannaipuram is just 5 kilometres south of the proposed Indian Neutrino observatory site, which would be in the Bodi West Hills.

Windmills
There are several windmills installed around the village, and currently generating energy.

References

Cities and towns in Theni district